Thomas "Tommy" E. Le Noir is a 27-year law enforcement veteran with the Arlington Police Department in Arlington, Texas.  Currently serving in the Cold Case Unit, Le Noir has worked more than 20 years in the department's homicide division, solving murders.

Early life
Le Noir was born in Bryan, Texas but spent his early years in Belle Chasse, Louisiana, part of the New Orleans metropolitan area.  As a teenager, Le Noir's family returned to Texas, settling in Arlington.  Le Noir graduated with a Bachelor of Science in criminal justice from the University of Texas at Arlington.

Le Noir himself credits his career in the law enforcement field to his father.  Aside from serving in the military, Le Noir's father was a heavyweight professional boxer who was  a natural "protector" of not only his family and friends, but of anyone he felt was being abused or mistreated.

Police career
Le Noir joined the Arlington Police Department in 1980 in the patrol division and in two years earned a spot in the narcotics division and focused on undercover work.  Three years later, Le Noir was selected to join the homicide division and was responsible for securing numerous capital convictions.

During his distinguished law enforcement career, Le Noir has earned 75 commendations, 11 departmental awards, his Master Police Officer State Certification and the honor of "Officer of the Year." A black belt in martial arts since 1975, Le Noir pioneered the Arlington Police Academy's now required program in defensive tactics.  He is also a certified instructor in basic and advanced courses in homicide investigation to outside police agencies at the North Texas Regional Police Academy and lectures extensively at colleges, high schools, civic groups and events and citizen police academies throughout the state.

Several of Le Noir's homicide cases have earned national media attention – having been featured on A&E's Cold Case Files,  Dick Wolf's Arrest & Trial and Court TV's Forensic Files among others.  One of Le Noir's most famous cases was that of serial killer Jack Reeves, which has been featured in eight different documentary programs including HBO's America Undercover: Autopsy series and the subject of the book Mail Order Murder by true crime author Patricia Springer.

Presently, Le Noir continues to investigate homicides in the Cold Case Homicide Unit. He is often called on to teach homicide investigation at the regional police academy, and lecture at universities while pursuing a second career in the entertainment venue. He has served in a consulting capacity on such shows as Rescue 911, and as the host for Murder, a Bunim-Murray Production that premiered on Spike TV in 2007.

Family life
Le Noir resides in Burleson, Texas with his wife and three daughters.

References

American municipal police officers
University of Texas at Arlington alumni
Living people
People from Burleson, Texas
People from Bryan, Texas
People from Belle Chasse, Louisiana
Year of birth missing (living people)